Old Turner Place, also known as King's Grant One, is a historic home located near Henry, Henry County, Virginia. It was built about 1804, and is a -story, log dwelling with a gable roof and massive gable end chimneys. Also on the property is a contributing smokehouse.

It was listed on the National Register of Historic Places in 2002.

References

Houses on the National Register of Historic Places in Virginia
Houses completed in 1804
Houses in Henry County, Virginia
National Register of Historic Places in Henry County, Virginia